The Bitch is a 1979 British drama film directed by Gerry O'Hara. It is a sequel to The Stud (1978) and, like its predecessor, is based on a novel by the British author Jackie Collins and stars her sister Joan Collins as Fontaine Khaled. Both films were made for a relatively small sum but were highly profitable at the box office, and were among the first successes in the emerging home video market of the early 1980s.

Plot
Following from where The Stud left off, Fontaine Khaled is now a divorcee. While she still leads an extravagant jetset lifestyle and did get a rather hefty divorce settlement, she no longer has the financial security of being a billionaire's wife and her once-successful London nightclub, "Hobo", is now failing due to a newer club taking away most of the former patrons. While on a flight returning to London from New York, she meets handsome Italian gambler Nico Cantafora. In order to impress Fontaine, Nico pretends he is a wealthy businessman, though he is actually a conman who owes money to the mafia, and he covertly uses Fontaine to smuggle a stolen diamond ring through airport customs which he intends to sell in London to pay off his debts.

Nico later tracks Fontaine down in order to retrieve the ring she unwittingly carried through customs for him. They spend the night together but when she discovers that he planted the ring in her coat, she throws him out. However, when Nico later learns that the ring is a fake, he gives it to Fontaine as a light-hearted gift and she forgives him. Meanwhile, Fontaine's own financial problems continue to mount and her accountant warns her that she is rapidly running out of money. To combat this, she attempts to restore her failing nightclub to its former glory. Meanwhile, she learns of Nico's mob connections after he is beaten up by local gangsters due to the money he still owes them.

Later, Fontaine and Nico are invited to the country estate of Fontaine's best friends, Leonard and Vanessa Grant. The Grants own a racehorse named Plato that is favourite to win an upcoming high-stakes derby. Still in debt to the mafia, Nico is instructed by local gangland boss Thrush Feathers to ensure that Plato loses the race. To this effect, Nico blackmails the horse's jockey to throw the race. Fontaine overhears Nico's plan and meets with Feathers to get a cut of the deal with him which could solve her financial problems. Feathers agrees so that Fontaine will not interfere with his plans and will also be indebted to him.

On the day of the race, the jockey falls off the horse as planned and loses the race. Fontaine pretends to Nico that she gambled her entire fortune on Plato to win and is now broke, but Nico is ecstatic because he backed the winning horse and now believes he can get the mafia off his back once and for all. However, the mafia have other ideas for him and after he gives Fontaine his winning tickets to collect on his behalf, he is carted off by Feathers' henchmen. Fontaine, meanwhile, goes to collect a double payout - with Nico's winning tickets and her cut from Feathers for going along with his scam.

With the money she made from the horse race scam, and her nightclub a success again, Fontaine is saved from financial ruin but when she arrives at her club one evening, she meets Feathers there who tells everyone he is now the club's new owner.

Cast
 
Joan Collins – Fontaine Khaled
Michael Coby – Nico Cantafora
Kenneth Haigh – Arnold Rinstead
Ian Hendry – Thrush Feathers 
Pamela Salem – Lynn 
Sue Lloyd – Vanessa Grant 
Mark Burns – Leonard Grant 
John Ratzenberger – Hal Leonard 
Carolyn Seymour – Polly Logan 
Doug Fisher – Sammy 
Peter Wight – Ricky
George Sweeney – Sandy Roots
Chris Jagger – Tony Langham
Sharon Fussey – Sammy's Girl
Maurice Thorogood – Paul

Bill Mitchell – Bernie
Alibe Parsons – Bernice
Mela White – Mrs. Walters
Maurice O'Connell – John-Jo
Anthony Heaton – Luke
Timothy Carlton – Jamie
Jill Melford – Sharon
Peter Burton – Hotel Night Manager
Annie Lambert – Hotel Desk Clerk
Steve Plytas – Louis Almond
Graham Simpson – Mario
Grant Santino – Disco Dancer
Cherry Gillespie – Disco Girl
William Van Der Pye – Disc Jockey
Tai Ling – Mai Ling
Kari Ann – Marinka
Bill Nighy – Flower Delivery Boy (uncredited)

Production
Jackie Collins had apparently given her sister Joan the film rights to both The Stud and The Bitch for free so that they could be turned into movies. After funding was secured, the films were co-produced by the sisters' husbands at the time (Oscar Lerman, who was married to Jackie, and Ron Kass, who was married to Joan).

Although The Stud novel was made into a film nine years after its 1969 publication, The Bitch novel was published in the same year the film was released. The film (written and directed by Gerry O'Hara) differs from Collins' novel slightly, particularly the ending. The novel contains a more romantic ending with Fontaine and Nico both backing the losing horse and ending up broke but still in love with each other, whereas the film has a more convoluted ending that left the door open for a potential sequel with Fontaine dealing with shady characters from London's underworld. Jackie Collins had anticipated writing a third book in the series, also to be filmed and starring Joan. However, this never came to pass; instead she went on to write the first of her Santangelo mafia-themed novels, 1981's Chances.

Reception
The Bitch had its premiere at the Rialto cinema in Leicester Square in London on 19 September 1979. It opened to the public the following day and finished second at the London box office behind Alien, grossing £30,723 from five cinemas in its first week. It also opened on 70 other screens in the London area. It was one of the most popular films of 1979 at the British box office. 

Although both The Stud and The Bitch were generally panned by critics and viewed as being little more than softcore porn, they were nevertheless both commercial successes and helped to revive Joan Collins' flagging career. Her performances as the insatiable "rich bitch" Fontaine Khaled later attracted the attention of Aaron Spelling and Esther and Richard Shapiro when they were looking for an actress to play the part of Alexis Carrington in their TV series Dynasty.

Due to its erotic adult content, the film was infamously banned from local cinema screens by Tameside Council (near Manchester in England) at the time of its release.

Music
Much in the vein of Saturday Night Fever, the film features a disco soundtrack. The theme song to the film performed by Olympic Runners became a UK Top 40 hit single in August 1979, while the soundtrack album itself peaked at peaked at #39 in November. Released on Warwick Records, the album contained twenty songs that were featured in the film. Although some of these were existing hits, several were written especially for the film, including the Olympic Runners' title track, "Pour Your Little Heart Out" by The Drifters, "Dancing On The Edge Of A Heartache" by The Hunters, "I Feel Lucky Tonight" by Linda Lewis and The Stylistics, "Music You Are" by George Chandler, and "Standing In The Shadows Of Love" by Deborah Washington. The film score was written by Biddu, with lyrics by Don Black.

Tracks included:

 Olympic Runners – "The Bitch"
 The Drifters – "Pour Your Little Heart Out"
 The Stylistics & Linda Lewis – "I Feel Lucky Tonight"
 The Hunters – "Dancing on the Edge of a Heartache"
 The Stylistics – "Just Like We Never Said Goodbye"
 Herbie Hancock – "I Thought It Was You"
 The Players Association – "Turn the Music Up"
 Gonzalez – "Haven't Stopped Dancing Yet"
 Blondie – "Denis"
 Deborah Washington – "Standing in the Shadows of Love"

 The Gibson Brothers – "Cuba"
 The Three Degrees – "Giving Up, Giving In"
 The Real Thing – "Can You Feel the Force?"
 Len Boone – "There's No Me Without You"
 Quantum Jump – "The Lone Ranger"
 Inner Circle – "Everything Is Great"
 The Dooleys – "Love of My Life"
 George Chandler – "Music, You Are"
 Leo Sayer – "You Make Me Feel Like Dancing"

References

External links

1979 films
1970s erotic drama films
British erotic drama films
Films based on British novels
Films directed by Gerry O'Hara
Films scored by Biddu
1979 drama films
1970s English-language films
1970s British films